Tyler Metcalfe (born June 12, 1984) is a Canadian-born Hungarian ice hockey player. He is currently playing with Alba Volán Székesfehérvár in the Austrian Hockey League.

Amateur career
Metcalfe played major junior hockey with the Seattle Thunderbirds of the Western Hockey League (WHL) before attending the University of Alberta where he played five seasons (2005 – 2010) with the Alberta Golden Bears in the CWUAA conference of Canadian Interuniversity Sport (CIS). In his final year, Metcalfe was presented with the Dr. Randy Gregg Award in recognition for his outstanding achievement in ice hockey, academics, and community involvement.

Awards and honours

References

External links

1984 births
Living people
Fehérvár AV19 players
Alberta Golden Bears ice hockey players
Canadian ice hockey defencemen
Hungarian ice hockey players
Seattle Thunderbirds players
People from Headingley
Ice hockey people from Manitoba
Canadian expatriate ice hockey players in Hungary
Canadian ice hockey left wingers